Jefferson Viana Correa (born June 10, 1989 in São Luís), known as Jefferson Maranhão, is a Brazilian footballer who plays for Sertãozinho as midfielder.

Career statistics

References

External links

1989 births
Living people
Brazilian footballers
Association football midfielders
Campeonato Brasileiro Série B players
Campeonato Brasileiro Série C players
Campeonato Brasileiro Série D players
Moto Club de São Luís players
Ituano FC players
Avaí FC players
Paraná Clube players
Mogi Mirim Esporte Clube players
Brasiliense Futebol Clube players
Clube Atlético Sorocaba players
Clube de Regatas Brasil players
Mirassol Futebol Clube players
Clube Atlético Linense players
Madureira Esporte Clube players
Sertãozinho Futebol Clube players